The 24 cm Theodor Kanone (E – Eisenbahnlafette (railroad mounting)) was a German railroad gun used during World War II in the Battle of France and on coast-defense duties in Occupied France for the rest of the war. Three were built during the 1930s using forty-year-old ex-naval guns.

Design
As part of the re-armament program initiated by the Nazis after taking power in 1933 the Army High Command (Oberkommando des Heeres - OKH) ordered Krupp to begin work on new railroad artillery designs, but they would take a long time to develop. Krupp pointed out that it could deliver a number of railroad guns much more quickly using obsolete guns already on hand and modernizing their original World War I mountings for which it still had drawings available.

Three 24 cm SK L/40 C/94 guns originally used by the - and  pre-dreadnoughts were placed on new mounts patterned on the E. u. B. (Eisenbahn und Bettungsgerüst - railroad and firing platform) mount used by the same guns in World War I as the 24 cm SK L/40 "Theodor Karl". The new mounts lacked the under-carriage pivot and rollers used for the firing platform (Bettungsgerüst) in World War I as the Vögele turntable (Drehscheibe) completely replaced the old system. The turntable consisted of a circular track with a pivot mount in the center for a platform on which the railroad gun itself was secured. A ramp was used to raise the railway gun to the level of the platform. The platform had rollers at each end which rested on the circular rail for 360° traverse. The gun could only be loaded at 0° elevation and so had to be re-aimed for each shot. One obvious change made for land service was the placement of a large counterweight just forward of the trunnions to counteract the preponderance of weight towards the breech. This, although heavy, was simpler than adding equilibrators to perform the same function. All three guns were delivered in 1937.

Ammunition
The shells for this gun were loaded using a four-wheeled ammunition cart to move the shells and powder from the rear of the mount where it was hoisted from the ground or an ammunition car by the on-mount crane. It used the German naval system of ammunition where the base charge was held in a metallic cartridge case and supplemented by another charge in a silk bag which was rammed first.

Combat history
Two Theodors equipped Railroad Artillery Battery (Artillerie-Batterie (E.) 674 during the French campaign as it supported XXV Army Corps, 7th Army, Army Group C from Ettenheim south of Strasbourg during its passage of the Rhine River. From July 1941 they spent the rest of the war on coast defense duties assigned to Batteries 664 and 674 in the vicinity of Hendaye and Saint-Jean-de-Luz near the Spanish border with France, although sources differ on which guns were assigned to which batteries on what dates. Both batteries were able to retreat to Germany by 1 September 1944 after the invasion of Normandy in June 1944, but nothing is known of their activities afterwards.

Notes

References 
 Engelmann, Joachim. German Railroad Guns in Action. Carrollton, Texas: Squadron/Signal, 1976 
 Engelmann, Joachim and Scheibert, Horst. Deutsche Artillerie 1934-1945: Eine Dokumentation in Text, Skizzen und Bildern: Ausrüstung, Gliederung, Ausbildung, Führung, Einsatz. Limburg/Lahn, Germany: C. A. Starke, 1974
 François, Guy. Eisenbahnartillerie: Histoire de l'artillerie lourd sur voie ferrée allemande des origines à 1945. Paris: Editions Histoire et Fortifications, 2006
 Gander, Terry and Chamberlain, Peter. Weapons of the Third Reich: An Encyclopedic Survey of All Small Arms, Artillery and Special Weapons of the German Land Forces 1939-1945. New York: Doubleday, 1979 
 Hogg, Ian V. German Artillery of World War Two. 2nd corrected edition. Mechanicsville, PA: Stackpole Books, 1997 
 Kosar, Franz. Eisenbahngeschütz der Welt. Stuttgart: Motorbook, 1999

External links
 SK L/40 at Navweaps.com

World War II artillery of Germany
Railway guns
240 mm artillery
Military equipment introduced in the 1930s